William B. "Bernie" Herpin, Jr. is a former member of Colorado Senate, serving from 2013 until 2015. A Republican, Herpin is a former member of the Colorado Springs, Colorado city council and a United States Navy veteran.

Herpin represented Senate District 11, which encompasses Manitou Springs, Colorado and eastern Colorado Springs. On September 10, 2013, he defeated recalled Senator John Morse in a historic recall election—the first such election in Colorado history.

Early life and career
Herpin was born in St. Petersburg, Florida in August 1943. He earned a Bachelor of Science degree in aerospace engineering from the University of Kansas and a Master of Arts degree in computer resource management from Webster University. Herpin and his wife Linda have three daughters and seven grandchildren and have resided in Colorado Springs, Colorado since 1962.

Military service
In August 1965, Herpin enlisted in the United States Navy. He graduated with a Bachelor of Science degree in Aerospace Engineering and was commissioned an Ensign in the US Navy.

In 1980, he transferred to the US Air Force and was assigned to the Headquarters, North American Aerospace Defense Command, Colorado Springs, Colorado. He retired from military service as a Captain in 1985 and that same year graduated from Webster University with a Master of Arts degree in Computer Resource Management.

Since 1985, Herpin has worked in the private-sector as a defense contractor supporting the Air Force, until leaving Lockheed Martin in December 2013 to serve as a Colorado State Senator.

Colorado Springs City Council
Herpin was originally appointed to an at-large council seat in March 2006 to complete the term of a member who resigned. He was elected to a full term in April 2009 as the representative of District 4, the southeast quadrant of the city.

Police volunteer
Herpin has served as a volunteer with the Colorado Springs Police Department for 30 years. He is currently the Team Leader of the Colorado Springs Police Department Handicap Parking Services Unit and a member of the CSPD Stetson Hills Division's Speed Monitoring Team.

Colorado Senate
Per the wording of the recall ballot, Herpin replaced Senator John Morse on September 10, 2013 when Morse was recalled in the first legislative recall election in Colorado history; Morse was recalled by a margin of 51% to 49%.

References

External links
Bernie Herpin Biography

1943 births
Living people
Republican Party Colorado state senators
University of Kansas alumni
Webster University alumni
Colorado Springs City Council members
Politicians from St. Petersburg, Florida
Politicians from Colorado Springs, Colorado
United States Navy officers
Military personnel from Colorado